The 2017–18 season was Football Club Internazionale Milano's 109th in existence and 102nd consecutive season in the top flight of Italian football. The side competed only in domestic tournaments; Serie A and the Coppa Italia.

On 20 May 2018, the final game of the season, Inter beat Lazio 3–2 at the Stadio Olimpico to qualify for the UEFA Champions League for the first time in six seasons.

Kits

Season overview
Former AS Roma coach Luciano Spalletti signed for Inter in early June. During the years he led Roma, the giallorossi won the Coppa Italia twice as well as a Super Cup against the nerazzurri.

Players

Squad information

Note: Lega Serie A imposes a cap on the first team squad at 25 players with additional requirements on homegrown players (marked as HG) and club-trained players (marked as CT), with exclusion for club-trained under-21 players (marked as U21).

Transfers

In

Out

Pre-season and friendlies

International Champions Cup

Competitions

Serie A

League table

Results summary

Results by round

Matches

Coppa Italia

Statistics

Appearances and goals

|-
! colspan=14 style="background:#dcdcdc; text-align:center| Goalkeepers

|-
! colspan=14 style="background:#dcdcdc; text-align:center| Defenders

|-
! colspan=14 style="background:#dcdcdc; text-align:center| Midfielders 

|-
! colspan=14 style="background:#dcdcdc; text-align:center| Forwards

|-
! colspan=14 style="background:#dcdcdc; text-align:center| Players transferred out during the season

Goalscorers

Last updated: 20 May 2018

Clean sheets

Last updated: 20 May 2018

Disciplinary record

Last updated: 20 May 2018

References

Inter Milan seasons
Internazionale